"Romantic" is a song by American singer Karyn White from her second studio album Ritual of Love (1991). It hit number one on the Billboard Hot 100 on November 2, 1991, making it her biggest hit to date. "Romantic" was also White's fourth number one on the Billboard Hot R&B Singles chart.

According to Billboard, the song is about sex, and was ranked number 28 on Billboard's "60 Sexiest Songs of All Time".

Charts

Weekly charts

Year-end charts

See also
List of Billboard Hot 100 number-one singles of 1991
List of number-one R&B singles of 1991 (U.S.)

References

1991 songs
1991 singles
Karyn White songs
Billboard Hot 100 number-one singles
Cashbox number-one singles
Songs written by Jimmy Jam and Terry Lewis
Song recordings produced by Jimmy Jam and Terry Lewis
Warner Records singles